Zsuzsa Elekes (born 13 May 1955 in Budapest) is a Hungarian organist and organ teacher at the Béla Bartók Conservatory in Budapest.

Education
Zsuzsa Elekes studied at the Béla Bartók Conservatory in her hometown in Budapest, where her teachers included Lajos Kertész (piano) and Gábor Lehotka (organ). She continued her studies at the Franz Liszt Academy of Music as a pupil of Ferenc Gergely (organ), Lajos Sztankay (piano) and János Sebestyén (harpsichord). Following her graduation, cum laude, in 1978, she undertook further study with Hannes Kästner in Leipzig, and participated in masterclasses with Marie-Claire Alain, Jean Guillou, Johannes-Ernst Köhler, Michael Radulescu, Michael Schneider and Luigi Tagliavini.

Musical career
Zsuzsa Elekes has won a number of prizes. She has made many LP, radio and CD recordings and undertaken concert tours in Germany, the Czech Republic, the United Kingdom, France, Italy, Austria, Poland, Romania, the Netherlands and Japan. From 1980 to 1994, Zsuzsa Elekes was soloist of the Hungarian National Philharmonic. Since 1994, she has taught organ at the Béla Bartók Conservatory in Budapest. She is also frequently invited to sit on the juries of international competitions.

Awards
 1975: 1st prize at the competition to celebrate the 100th birthday of the Franz Liszt Academy of Music, Budapest
 1975: Artisjus Prize, Budapest
 1978: 2nd prize at the 1st International Franz Liszt Organ Competition, Budapest
 1979: 3rd prize at the Prague Spring International Music Competition, Prague
 1980: 1st prize (the Bach Prize) at the International Johann Sebastian Bach Competition, Leipzig
 1986: Franz Liszt Memorial Award, Budapest
 1988: Prize of the Cziffra Foundation, Budapest
 1992: Artisjus Prize, Budapest
 1993: Artisjus Prize, Budapest
 1994: Franz Liszt Prize of the Hungarian Ministry of Culture
 1995: Grand Prix International du Disque (for her Liszt performances)

References
 Zsuzsa Elekes on the BMC's website

1955 births
Living people
Musicians from Budapest
Hungarian classical organists
Women organists
21st-century organists
21st-century women musicians